Club Deportivo Corralejo was a Spanish football club based in Corralejo, Fuerteventura, in the autonomous community of the Canary Islands. Founded in 1975 and dissolved in 2004, the club played 14 seasons in Tercera División, and a further three in Segunda División B. They held home matches at Estadio Vicente Carreño Alonso, which holds 2,000 spectators.

History
Founded in 1975, Corralejo first reached the Tercera División in 1987, after achieving three consecutive promotions. In 1994, the club achieved a first-ever promotion to the Segunda División B in the play-offs, but suffered immediate relegation afterwards.

Corralejo returned to the third tier in 2002, after winning their group in the Tercera. In 2004, the club merged with CD Fuerteventura to create UD Fuerteventura, and subsequently folded. A new CD Corralejo was founded in 2005.

Season to season

3 seasons in Segunda División B
14 seasons in Tercera División

References

External links
BDFutbol team profile

Football clubs in the Canary Islands
Association football clubs established in 1975
Association football clubs disestablished in 2004
Fuerteventura
1975 establishments in Spain
2004 disestablishments in Spain